Acanthodactylus aureus, commonly called the golden fringe-fingered lizard, is a species of lizard in the family Lacertidae. The species is endemic to northwestern Africa.

Geographic range
A. aureus is found in Mauritania, Morocco, Senegal, and Western Sahara.

Reproduction
A. aureus is oviparous.

References

Further reading
Günther A (1903). "Reptiles from Rio de Oro, Western Sahara". Novitates Zoologicae 10: 298–299. (Acanthodactylus scutellatus aureus, new subspecies, pp. 298–299).
Salvador, Alfredo (1982). "A revision of the lizards of the genus Acanthodactylus (Sauria: Lacertidae)". Bonner Zoologische Monographien (16): 1–167. (Acanthodactylus aureus, new status, pp. 122–126, Map 24, Figures 77–79). (in English, with an abstract in German).

Acanthodactylus
Lacertid lizards of Africa
Reptiles described in 1903
Taxa named by Albert Günther